The Torneo Argentino A (in English "Argentine A Tournament") was one of the two leagues that formed the regionalised third level of the  Argentine football league system. Clubs in the Torneo Argentino have indirect membership in AFA, while clubs in the Primera B Metropolitana (the other third division) have direct membership in AFA. All teams with indirect membership are from outside the city of Buenos Aires and its metropolitan area (Greater Buenos Aires), while most of the direct members are from the aforementioned area.

Final format (2013-14)

First stage
The teams were divided into two zones, North and South, all of which went to the Second Stage: the first four of each zone and the fifth best team of both zones qualified to the "Nonagonal Final", and the other teams qualified to Revalida Stage. All teams play each other in a round-robin tournament.

Second stage

Nonagonal Final
Consisted of nine teams that qualified from the First Stage. The tournament winner was promoted to the 2014 Primera B Nacional. The 2nd and 3rd teams advanced directly to the Fourth Stage, while the 4th to the 9th advanced to the Third Stage.

"Revalida Stage"
The fifteen clubs that did not qualify for the Nonagonal Final were grouped into three zones of five teams each. To integrate the zones a table was drawn with the fifteen clubs and its overall standings with points obtained in the First Stage. Teams in position 1,6,7,12,15 went to Zone A; teams in position 2,5,8,11,14 went to Zone B and teams in position 3,4,9,10,13 went to Zone C. The 1st and the 2nd of each zone qualified to the Third Stage.

Third to Sixth Stage
Was played by the teams ranked 2nd to 9th in the Nonagonal Final and the teams that qualified from Revalida Stage. To order the matches a table was drawn which contained the teams  from the Nonagonal Final and the teams  from the Revalida numbering them from 2º to 15º (teams from Nonagonal Final were 2º to 9º and teams from Revalida were 10º to º15).

Third stage
This Stage was played by the teams ranked 4º to 9º from the Nonagonal Final and the teams from the Revalida. The winning teams qualify for Fourth Stage. In case of a tie of points and goal difference, the teams from position 4º to 9º qualified to the next stage.

Fourth stage
This Stage was played by the teams ranked 2º and 3º from the Nonagonal Final and the teams that qualified from the Third Stage. In case of a tie points and goal difference, the teams from position 2º, 3º, W1 and W2  qualified to the next stage.

Fifth stage
This Stage was played by the teams that qualified from the Fourth Stage. The matches will be W1 vs W4 and W2 vs W3. In case of a tie points and goal difference, W1 and W2 qualified for the next stage.

Sixth stage
This Stage was played by the teams that qualified from the Fifth Stage, W1 vs W2. The winning team will be promoted to 2014 Primera B Nacional. In case of a tie points and goal difference, W1 was promoted.

Relegation
After the Revalida Stage a table was drawn up with the addition of points of the First Stage and Revalida Stage. The teams that were located in the last position of each of the tables was relegated to 2014 Torneo Federal A.

List of champions

Titles by club

Seasons in Torneo Argentino A

Note: 19 seasons in total, from season 1995–96 to 2013–14 inclusive.

Top scorers

Top Scorers by Tournament

External links
Torneo Argentino A website 
Torneo Argentino A at AFA website 
 Ascenso del Interior 
 Interior Futbolero

 
Defunct football leagues in Argentina
Argentina